The Tatra 700 is a rear-engined luxury car released in 1996 by the Czech car maker Tatra. It was essentially a heavily restyled version of the Tatra 613 model it replaced. It is one of the last production cars with an air-cooled engine. 

The T700 was offered as a 4-door saloon with a 3.5-litre 90° air-cooled V8 petrol engine. A  version called T700 GT was also listed, although this may have remained a one-off.

The model was not successful, nor produced in large numbers, and production was halted in July 1999. Only 75 of these cars were ever built. The Tatra 700 was the last passenger car made by Tatra, although it continued to build trucks.

Specifications 
 motor: Tatra 700, air-cooled V8
 displacement: 3495 cc (3.5 L), or 4360 cc (4.4 L)
 max. power :  at 5750 rpm, or 
 max. torque : , or 
 top speed: , or 
 0–100 km/h (0-62 mph): 10.8 s, or less than 5 s (T700 GT)

References

External links 

700
Cars powered by rear-mounted 8-cylinder engines
Full-size vehicles
Luxury vehicles
Sedans
Cars introduced in 1996